"Keep on Running" is a song by German pop group Milli Vanilli before and during the lip-synching scandal and The Real Milli Vanilli after. It was released in 1990 and peaked at number two in Austria, number four in Germany, number six in Italy and number eight in Switzerland. The song was also released in France, but failed to enter the singles chart, as did "Too Late (True Love)".

"Keep on Running" would be the duo’s final single as Milli Vanilli.

Critical reception
Gary Crossing from Record Mirror wrote, "It's nice to see these boys back in the forefront of the dance music scene after having their reputations sallied by some unsavoury accusations with regards to their vocal talents. Here they're in someone else's fine voices with this busy stonker of a floor filler, which occasionally lapses into a 'Dreadlock Holiday' stylee reggae lilt. I'm speechless."

Track listings
 CD maxi
 "Keep on Running" (Club Mix) — 6:40
 "The End of Good Times" — 4:09
 "Keep on Running" (Running Man Mix) — 5:45
 "Keep on Running" (Radio Version) — 4:04

 7" single
 "Keep on Running" — 3:58
 "The End of Good Times" — 3:45

 12" maxi
 "Keep on Running" (Club Mix) — 6:15
 "The End of Good Times" — 3:35
 "Keep on Running" (Running Man Mix) — 5:45
 "Keep on Running" (Radio Mix) — 3:58

 "Real Voices of Milli Vanilli" CD maxi
 "Keep on Running" (Club Mix) — 7:50
 "The End of Good Times" — 3:39
 "Keep on Running" (Running Man Mix) — 5:45
 "Keep on Running" (Radio Version) — 4:04

Charts

Weekly charts

Year-end charts

Certifications

References

1990 singles
Hansa Records singles
Milli Vanilli songs
Songs written by Frank Farian
Song recordings produced by Frank Farian
1990 songs